Stillingia querceticola is a species of flowering plant in the family Euphorbiaceae. It was described in 1995. It is native to southwestern Mexico.

References

querceticola
Plants described in 1995
Flora of Mexico